The Treasure Valuation Committee (TVC) is an advisory non-departmental public body of the Department for Culture, Media and Sport (DCMS) based in London, which offers expert advice to the government on items of declared treasure in England, Wales, and Northern Ireland that museums there may wish to acquire from the Crown.

The terms of reference of the TVC are laid down in the Treasure Act 1996 Code of Practice, which also details the principle of reward payments to finders and landowner for finds of Treasure which are acquired by museums. The TVC recommends to the Secretary of State the value of treasure finds which come before it, and also makes recommendations on the allocation of rewards and abatements of rewards where circumstances require.   Minutes of its meetings are published on the website of the Portable Antiquities Scheme, after all of the cases discussed therein are concluded.  The TVC meets at the British Museum but is independent of the museum.

Members

Members of the committee are appointed by ministers in the DCMS.  Terms of service are currently five years in length, with the possibility of renewal for a total length of service of 10 years. Members are not paid for their service.

Chair: Professor Roger Bland OBE – Former Keeper of the Department of Britain, Europe and Prehistory at the British Museum. President of the British Numismatic Society and vice-president of the Royal Numismatic Society.
Harry Bain – Publisher and Editor of The Searcher magazine for metal detector users and amateur archaeologists.
Gail Boyle – Senior Curator (Archaeology and World Cultures) for Bristol Culture
Marian Campbell – Expert in medieval and post-medieval artefacts and former Senior Curator of Metalwork at the Victoria and Albert Museum
Megan Gooch – Head of the Centre for Digital Scholarship and Digital Humanities Support, Oxford University. Expert in numismatics.
Christopher Martin – Proprietor and managing director of CJ Martin Coins and Ancient Art Ltd, and St James's Ancient Art. He is also Chairman of the British Numismatic Trade Association (BNTA), and of the Antiquities Dealers Association.
Lucinda Orr – Barrister with Enyo Law, with extensive knowledge of antiquities collections and particular expertise in Medieval coins and jewellery.
Dr Leslie Webster - Researcher and Emeritus Keeper of the Department of Prehistory and Europe at the British Museum. Expert in Early Medieval antiquities.

History and former members
With the commencement of the Treasure Act on 24 September 1997, the Treasure Valuation Committee replaced the earlier Treasure Trove Reviewing Committee.  Those who have served on the Treasure Valuation Committee include:
Trevor Austin – General Secretary of the National Council of Metal Detecting
Jim Brown – Specialist with Dix Noonan Webb auctioneers
Professor Ian Carradice – Expert in ancient coinage and former professor of Art History and Director of University Museum Collections, University of St Andrews.
John Casey – Expert in ancient numismatics
John Cherry – Former Keeper of the Department of Medieval and Later Antiquities at the British Museum
Peter A. Clayton – Archaeologist and Numismatist, former Head of Antiquities at Seaby's Ltd.
Thomas Curtis – Expert in ancient numismatics and affiliated with AH Baldwin and Sons coin dealers
Dr David Dykes – Expert in medieval coinage and former Director of the National Museum of Wales from 1986 to 1989.
Patrick Finn – Expert in Medieval coinage and affiliated with Whyte's auctioneers and AH Baldwin and Sons coin dealers
Hetty Gleave – Partner at Hunters Solicitors in Lincoln's Inn. Specialist in cultural property law.
Dennis Jordan – President of the National Council of Metal Detecting 
Arthur MacGregor – Expert in Medieval artefacts. Director of the Society of Antiquaries and curator in the Department of Antiquaries, Ashmolean Museum.
Jack Ogden – An archaeologist and historian focusing on the development of jewellery materials and techniques
Professor Norman Palmer QC CBE – Expert in Art and Antiquity Law.
Dr Tim Pestell – Senior Curator of Archaeology in the Norwich Castle Museum. Responsible for the post-Roman collections.
Professor Lord Renfrew of Kaimsthorn – Senior Fellow of the McDonald Institute for Archaeological Research.
May Sinclair – Expert in Medieval coinage, consultant numismatist at Spink and Son coin dealers
Ian Stewart, The Rt Hon. the Lord Stewartby RD FBA – Archaeologist and numismatist

Well-known finds that have been valued by the TVC include the Ringlemere Cup, Vale of York Hoard and the Staffordshire Hoard.

See also
The Treasure Act 1996

References

External links
The British Museum
Treasure Act 1996
The National Council for Metal Detecting. ncmd.co.uk

Archaeology of the United Kingdom
Treasure troves in the United Kingdom
Department for Digital, Culture, Media and Sport
Non-departmental public bodies of the United Kingdom government